Ilse Amalie Mathilde von Randow (née Henneberg, 12 June 1901 – 18 October 1998) was a New Zealand weaver.

Life and career
Ilse von Randow was the daughter of Bruno Paul Eduard Henneberg, university professor, and Helene Mathilde Fritze. Her family was actively involved in artistic and scientific culture. In 1917 von Randow enrolled at the Berbenich art school in Darmstadt, where she studied until 1919 when changes in her family finances led her to quit her studies and returned home, taking up a job as a medical illustrator at Giessen University.

In 1927, von Randow moved to China, to become a laboratory technician at T’ung-Chi university, a German-language institute near Shanghai. She married Elgar Armin von Randow, German vice consul to Shanghai, in 1935: the couple had two sons, and divorced in 1945. Von Randow had been taught to weave by her mother and she turned to these skills to support herself and her children, designing fabrics for local textile companies.

In 1949, when the communists took power in Shanghai in the Shanghai Campaign, von Randow sought refugee status for herself and her sons in New Zealand. They arrived in Auckland in April 1952.

In Auckland, von Randow established herself as a leading figure in modernist craft, exhibiting widely and establishing a studio at the Auckland Art Gallery where she taught younger weavers including Zena Abbott and Ida Lough. Her loom had been dismantled and shipped from China to New Zealand, with which she started to create hand woven wall hangings that made her famous.

In the mid 1960s, von Randow became disillusioned with what she saw as an anti-modernist attitude amongst craft practitioners in New Zealand. In 1966, she left for England, settling in West Mersea, where she retired from weaving and took up first batik and later painting.
 
In 1992, von Randow returned to New Zealand to take part in the 1950s Show at the Auckland Art Gallery, and decided to remain to be closer to family. She died in Auckland on 18 October 1998, and her ashes were buried at Waikumete Cemetery.

Work 
Von Randow's major public work was a set of curtains commissioned for the Auckland City Art Gallery in December 1957. Completed in 1958, the curtains were the largest piece of handweaving created in New Zealand at that date. The curtains are now held in the collection of the Auckland Museum.

Von Randow collaborated with Colin McCahon to create, Woven Kauri, a kauri that hung at the entrance to the Auckland Art Gallery, but was lost in the 1960s after a renovation.

A retrospective of her work was held at the Auckland War Memorial Museum in 1998. She donated her workbooks and weaving samples from the length of her career to the museum.

In 2013, von Randow's curtains were the subject of a project at the Auckland Art Gallery by contemporary New Zealand artist Ruth Buchanan.

Awards 

1953: Esmonde Kohn Prize for excellence in the applied arts by the Auckland Society of Arts

References

Further information
 Douglas Lloyd-Jenkins, The textiles of Ilse von Randow, Auckland: Auckland Museum, 1998.  
 Douglas Lloyd-Jenkins, 'Weaving Light: Ilse von Randow and Colin McCahon', Art New Zealand, no 94, Autumn 2000.

External links
 Von Randow's work at Auckland Museum
 The Group Show 1966 digitised catalogue for  exhibition in Christchurch in which von Randow was included
 The Group Show 1965 digitised catalogue for exhibition in Christchurch in which von Randow was included
 An exhibition of New Zealand Craft Work digitised catalogue for 1959 exhibition at Auckland Art Gallery in which von Randow was included

1901 births
1998 deaths
People from Giessen
New Zealand weavers
German emigrants to New Zealand
New Zealand textile artists
People from West Mersea
Women textile artists
Burials at Waikumete Cemetery
German textile artists